Karolina Jarzyńska-Nadolska (born September 6, 1981 in Oleśnica) is a Polish long-distance runner. She competed in the marathon at the 2012 Summer Olympics, placing 36th with a time of 2:30:57.

She also represented her country at the 2010 European Athletics Championships, but did not finish the marathon distance. She took a career break from mid-2014 to late-2015 to have a child and returned to competition in late 2015.

Jarzyńska set a Polish record for the event in 2013 by winning the Łódź Marathon in a time of 2:26:44 hours.

Competition record

References

1981 births
Living people
Polish female long-distance runners
Polish female marathon runners
Olympic athletes of Poland
Athletes (track and field) at the 2012 Summer Olympics
Athletes (track and field) at the 2020 Summer Olympics
People from Oleśnica
Sportspeople from Lower Silesian Voivodeship
World Athletics Championships athletes for Poland
20th-century Polish women
21st-century Polish women